Anthony Price (1928–2019) was a British author.

Anthony Price may also refer to:
Anthony Price (philosopher), professor of philosophy
A. J. Price (born 1986), American basketball player
Antony Price (born 1945), London fashion designer

See also
Tony Price (disambiguation)